Xiejiawan  is a station on Line 2 of Chongqing Rail Transit in Chongqing Municipality, China. It is located in the Jiulongpo District. The station began service in 2006. In 2019, the station turned into an interchange station with the opening of the southwestern extension of Loop Line. Nevertheless, due to the transfer passage is still under construction, all passengers transferring between the two lines must exit the station first.

Station structure

Line 2

Loop line

References

Jiulongpo District
Railway stations in Chongqing
Railway stations in China opened in 2004
Chongqing Rail Transit stations